Stephan Michael Sechi is a game designer who has worked primarily on role-playing games.

Career
In 1982, Stephan Michael Sechi, Steven Cordovano and Vernie Taylor each put in $600 and formed the company Bard Games to produce their own Dungeons & Dragons supplements.

Sechi and Cordovano's The Compleat Alchemist (1983) was the company's first product and presented a new character class: a magic-item maker. Sechi's The Compleat Adventurer (1983) offered a number of variant classes for thieves and fighters, while Sechi and Taylor's The Compleat Spell Caster (1983) presented many variant magic-user classes. Sechi oversaw Bard's next project, The Atlantis Trilogy for Bard Games, which took three years to complete but eventually the three books were published as The Arcanum (1984), The Lexicon (1985), and The Bestiary (1986).

Due to personal and financial disagreements that arose in the wake of his completion of The Atlantis Trilogy, Sechi sold his shares in Bard Games to Cordovano and left. Over the next three months he began work on another trilogy of supplements that would form the basis of a new RPG; Cordovano decided that he did not want to run Bard Games and sold it back to Sechi, who now had a publishing house to produce his new game which he called Talislanta (1987) . The success of Talislanta allowed Sechi to collect his Atlantis setting material into a new sourcebook, Atlantis: The Lost World (1988) and shortly afterward could publish a second edition of the Talislanta game in the Talislanta Handbook & Campaign Guide (1989). When a buyer from Waldenbooks placed a huge order on Atlantis: The Lost World, Sechi was reluctant to fill it but eventually did; about a year later many of the books were returned, forcing Bard Games to refund about $20,000. Sechi repaid its debts to the book trade, paid off his partner, and then shut Bard Games down. Sechi retained control of Bard Games' properties, and licensed the rights to Wizards of the Coast, Death's Edge Games, Daedalus Entertainment, and Pharos Press.

In 2005, Morrigan Press licensed Talislanta from Sechi and simultaneously bought the rights to two of the Atlantis books, The Lexicon and The Besitary. In 2010, Sechi placed the entire corpus of Talislanta books under a Creative Commons license.

References

External links
 

Living people
Role-playing game designers
Year of birth missing (living people)